Lion is a 1956 picture book written and illustrated by William Pène du Bois. The book tells the story of an "artist" who attempts to invent a cloud lion. The book was a recipient of a 1957 Caldecott Honor for its illustrations.

References

1956 children's books
American picture books
Caldecott Honor-winning works